Thaumatopsis magnificus is a moth in the family Crambidae. It was described by Charles H. Fernald in 1891. It is found in North America, where it has been recorded from New Mexico, Arizona and Colorado.

The wingspan is about 25 mm. The forewings are dull yellow with white stripes. The hindwings are uniform white. Adults are on wing in June and July.

References

Crambini
Moths described in 1891
Moths of North America